Stephen Walter Haycox is an emeritus professor of history at the University of Alaska Anchorage (UAA), author, and columnist for the Anchorage Daily News. He has written about the history of Alaska.

He was born in the Upper Midwest and went to high school in a suburb of New York. He was a musician in the Navy and served in the Pacific. He has a Ph.D. from the University of Oregon. His book Frigid Embrace contrasts the non-native Alaskans who come to the state for profit in often exploitative natural resource industries against the indigenous residents lifestyles of people who are permanent residents.

Haycox is interviewed in the documentary film The Harriman Alaska Expedition Retraced.

His book Battleground Alaska explores conflict between state's rights and federalism in environmental policy.

He received the Alaska Governor's Humanities Award in 2003, the University of Alaska Edith R. Bullock Prize for Excellence in 2002, was named the Alaska Historical Society's Historian of the Year in 2003, and was named a distinguished professor at UAA.

He wrote the foreword to In Pursuit of Alaska, An Anthology.

Bibliography

Alaska: An American Colony
Frigid Embrace: Politics, Economics and Environment in Alaska 
An Alaska Anthology: Interpreting the Past, co-editor
Battleground Alaska; Fighting Federal Power in America's Last Wilderness

References

20th-century American historians
American male non-fiction writers
21st-century American historians
21st-century American male writers
American columnists
Historians of Alaska
Living people
Place of birth missing (living people)
University of Alaska Anchorage faculty
University of Oregon alumni
Year of birth missing (living people)
20th-century American male writers